Surugathyris is a monotypic genus of brachiopods belonging to the family Cancellothyrididae. The only species is Surugathyris suragaensis.

The species is found in Japan.

References

Terebratulida
Brachiopod genera
Monotypic brachiopod genera